Veldhuizen may refer to:

 Veldhuizen, a hamlet, former municipality, and neighbourhood in the municipality of Utrecht, the Netherlands
 Veldhuizen (Drenthe), a hamlet
 Veldhuizen (Gelderland), a hamlet
 Veldhuizen (surname), a surname
 Willem van Veldhuizen (1954) is a Dutch painter.